Thomas Edward Bridges, D.D. (c.1783–1843) was an Oxford college head in the 19th century.

Bridges matriculated at University College, Oxford in 1798, at age 15, graduating at Corpus Christi College B.A. in 1802, M.A. in 1806, B.D. in 1815, and D.D. in 1823. He was President of Corpus Christi College, Oxford, from 1823 to 1843. He died 3 September 1843.

References

1783 births
1843 deaths
Alumni of University College, Oxford
Presidents of Corpus Christi College, Oxford